The Font Library is a project devoted to hosting and encouraging the creation of fonts released under Free Licenses. It is a sister project to Openclipart and hosts over 6000 fonts from over 250 contributors. These are intended to be downloaded, remixed and shared freely. Originally created as an initiative in 2006, the project relaunched on May 12, 2011 at the Libre Graphics Meeting 2011 in Montreal by Fabricatorz developer Christopher Adams.

The Open Font Library also hosts a mailing list through which font developers discuss ways to improve libre fonts.

The site was started with a deployment of ccHost version 4, and in 2008 Dave Crossland made a funding campaign that raised over US$10,000 from Mozilla, Prince XML, River Valley and TUG to transition to ccHost 5 with a new brand to promote web font linking. However, the work done with the funds was not published until 2010 at the 2010 Libre Graphics Meeting in Brussels.

The project's members meet annually at the Libre Graphics Meeting. In 2011, work supported by Dave Crossland, Christopher Adams, Fabricatorz and other community members got a major release at the LGM in Montreal. Fabricatorz built the project on the Aiki Framework and managed development via Launchpad.

In April 2012, Fabricatorz released an update to Open Font Library that includes an interactive font catalogue preview feature, HTML and CSS code implementation, and a new design by Manufactura Independente.

See also
FontForge
Libre Graphics Meeting
SIL Open Font License (OFL)

References

External links

Open content projects
Typography
Open-source typefaces